Doki can refer to:

 Doki (TV series), an animated children's television series, or the eponymous character from Discovery Kids Latin America
 Doki, one of the two central characters in the Korean cartoon There She Is!!
 Doki (app), a mobile app designed to teach languages

See also
 Doki doki (disambiguation)
 Dhoki (disambiguation)